Group A was one of two groups of the 2017 IIHF World Championship. The four best placed teams advanced to the playoff round, while the last placed team was relegated to Division I in 2018.

Standings

All times are local (UTC+2).

Matches

Sweden vs Russia

United States vs Germany

Latvia vs Denmark

Slovakia vs Italy

Germany vs Sweden

Italy vs Russia

United States vs Denmark

Latvia vs Slovakia

Germany vs Russia

United States vs Sweden

Italy vs Latvia

Slovakia vs Denmark

United States vs Italy

Slovakia vs Germany

Russia vs Denmark

Sweden vs Latvia

Sweden vs Italy

Denmark vs Germany

Latvia vs United States

Russia vs Slovakia

Italy vs Germany

Slovakia vs United States

Denmark vs Sweden

Denmark vs Italy

Russia vs Latvia

Sweden vs Slovakia

Russia vs United States

Germany vs Latvia

References

External links
Official website

A